Max Dalban (27 May 1908 – 9 February 1958) was a French film actor.

Selected filmography
 Boudu Saved from Drowning (1932)
 Chotard and Company (1933)
 Street Without a Name (1934)
 Toni (1935)
 The Alibi (1937)
 Vidocq (1939)
 The Ideal Couple (1946)
 Lessons in Conduct (1946)
 Panic (Panique) (1947)
 Maya (1949)
 Street Without a King (1950)
 My Wife Is Formidable (1951)
 Two Pennies Worth of Violets (1951)
 Judgement of God (1952)
 It Happened in Paris (1952)
 The Slave (1953)
 Double or Quits (1953)
 Leguignon the Healer (1954)
 I'll Get Back to Kandara (1956)
 It's All Adam's Fault (1958)

References

Bibliography
 Nicholas Macdonald. In Search of La Grande Illusion: A Critical Appreciation of Jean Renoir's Elusive Masterpiece. McFarland, 2013.

External links

1908 births
1958 deaths
French male film actors